Norshen or Norşen may refer to:
 Norshen, Shirak, Armenia
 Norshen, Nagorno-Karabakh, Martuni Province, Artsakh
 Yenikənd, Goranboy, Azerbaijan
 Norsen, School in Helsinki